Turkey Creek is a stream in the Ozarks of southern Missouri and northern Arkansas. It is a tributary of Lake Taneycomo. The stream source is two-thirds of a mile south of the Missouri - Arkansas border in Boone County north of the village of Crest. The Missouri Pacific Railroad line follows the stream course after exiting the Crest railroad tunnel under Arkansas State Route 14 at Crest. North of the state line in Taney County the stream flows north through west Hollister to its confluence with Lake Taneycomo south of Branson.

Turkey Creek was so named on account of wild turkeys in the area.

Coordinates: source: ; mouth:

See also
List of rivers of Arkansas
List of rivers of Missouri

References

Rivers of Boone County, Arkansas
Rivers of Taney County, Missouri
Rivers of Missouri
Rivers of Arkansas